The Vasco da Gama Garden is a garden in São Lázaro, Macau, China. It is located between Rua de Ferreira do Amaral, Calçada do Gaio and Estrada da Vitória.

History
The garden was created in the 19th century in Portuguese Macau. Along with Victory Garden, the Vasco da Gama Garden was part of the Vasco da Gama avenue built in 1898. In 1911, the bust of Vasco da Gama was erected. In 1997, the garden underwent renovation where fountains and barrier-free access were built on the lower-level of the garden and a small pond on the upper-level. In 2004, the garden underwent another renovation where an underground car park was constructed beneath it.

Geology
The park is situated between Rua de Ferreira do Amaral, Calçada do Gaio and Estrada da Vitória. It features a wave-shaped lake on the lower level of the garden and a fountain with waterspouts. It has a length of 500 meters and a width of 65 meters which consists of two plots of land.

See also
 List of tourist attractions in Macau

References

Gardens in Macau